Hoya is a rural locality in the Scenic Rim Region, Queensland, Australia.

Geography 
Hoya is farming land approximately 150 metres about sea level.

The Boonah Fassifern Road (State Route 90) runs along part of the southern boundary.

History 
A Lutheran church was opened in Hoya in 1882.

The Fassifern railway line (Queensland's first branch railway line) opened from Ipswich to Harrisville on 10 July 1882. On 12 September 1887 the line was extended to Dugundan with Hoya being served by Hoya railway station on Hoya Road near the junction with Heise Road. The line closed in June 1964.

A postal receiving office was opened in Hoya on 22 January 1892. A post office opened on 1 July 1927. It closed on 1 April 1955.

The locality containrf 87 households, in which 52.3% of the population were and 47.7% of the population were females with a median age of 52, 14 years above the national average. The average weekly household income was $1,406, $32 below the national average. None of Hoya's population was either of Aborigional or Torres Strait Islander descent. 74.5% of the population aged 15 or over was either registered or de facto married, while 25.5% of the population is not married. 23.9% of the population is currently attending some form of education. The most common nominated ancestries were Australian (31.2%), English (27.7%) and German (10.6%), while the most common country of birth was Australia (87.1%), and the most commonly spoken language at home was English (90.0%). The most common nominated religions were No religion (24.6%), the Uniting Church (14.5%) and Anglican (12.7%). The most common occupation was a professional (21.1%) and the majority/plurality of residents worked 40 or more hours per week (30.6%).

References

External links 

Scenic Rim Region
Localities in Queensland